The Dead C is the eponymously titled seventh album by New Zealand noise rock band The Dead C. It was a double CD set released in 2000 on the band's own Language Recordings imprint.

Track listing

Accolades

Personnel 
The Dead C – production, recording
Michael Morley – guitar, sampler, synthesizer
Bruce Russell – guitar, tape
Robbie Yeats – drums, guitar, synthesizer

References

2000 albums
The Dead C albums